Scopula oryx is a moth of the family Geometridae. It was described by Claude Herbulot in 1985. It is endemic to South Africa.

References

Moths described in 1985
oryx
Taxa named by Claude Herbulot
Endemic moths of South Africa